Jennie "Bimmo" Bimson (born 13 October 1976 in Wordsley, West Midlands) is a retired English field hockey player.  A former member of the England and Great Britain women's field hockey team during the late 1990s and 2000s, she played in midfield and as a forward.

She retired from hockey after the 2008 Olympics.

References

External links
 

Olympic profile

1976 births
English female field hockey players
Living people
Olympic field hockey players of Great Britain
British female field hockey players
Field hockey players at the 1998 Commonwealth Games
Field hockey players at the 2002 Commonwealth Games
Field hockey players at the 2006 Commonwealth Games
Field hockey players at the 2008 Summer Olympics
Commonwealth Games silver medallists for England
Commonwealth Games bronze medallists for England
People from Wordsley
Alumni of Loughborough University
People educated at Bromsgrove School
Commonwealth Games medallists in field hockey
Loughborough Students field hockey players
Medallists at the 1998 Commonwealth Games
Medallists at the 2002 Commonwealth Games
Medallists at the 2006 Commonwealth Games